Yang Xiong is a fictional character in Water Margin, one of the Four Great Classical Novels in Chinese literature. Nicknamed "Sick Guan Suo", he ranks 32nd among the 36 Heavenly Spirits, the first third of the 108 Stars of Destiny.

Background
Good-looking with thick eyebrows, eyes like those of a fenghuang and a sparse beard on his chin, Yang Xiong, whose body is covered with tattoos of flowers, resembles Guan Suo but has a pale complexion. He is thus nicknamed "Sick Guan Suo". Guan Suo is a character in Chinese folklore said to be the son of Guan Yu of the Three Kingdoms era and imaged to look like his father.  A skilled fighter from Henan, Yang Xiong works as a chief prison warden and executioner in Jizhou (薊州; present-day Ji County, Tianjin).

Killing his adulteress wife
One day, after beheading a criminal, Yang Xiong is showered with gifts from grateful onlookers as he makes his way back to his office through a busy street. A group of hooligans intent on snatching away the gifts suddenly spring on and restrain him, catching him off-guard. Shi Xiu, who is stranded in Jizhou and happens to come by carrying firewood which he sells for a living, rushes to his aid. The two together drive away the thugs. Yang is grateful to Shi Xiu and requests they become sworn brothers.

Yang Xiong invites Shi Xiu to live with him and sets up a meat shop for him to run. Shi Xiu is sharp-eyed and soon detects that Yang's wife Pan Qiaoyun is having a secret affair with the monk Pei Ruhai. He informs Yang Xiong about it. However, Yang goes to dine with his colleagues after the tip-off and in a drunken state chastises his wife for being unchaste when he gets home. He forgets the scolding the next day, which allows the woman to turn the table on Shi Xiu before Yang questions her. She lies that she has rejected Shi's advances, inducing Yang to conclude that Shi has bad-mouthed her so as to save himself. Believing his wife, Yang signals to Shi that their ties are severed by closing the meat shop. Knowing he has been maligned, Shi is determined to clear his name.

One night, Shi Xiu ambushes and kills Pei Ruhai in a deserted lane outside Yang Xiong's house when the monk is leaving it after a tryst with Pan. He then takes the monk's robe and other personal effects to show to Yang Xiong. Now quite convinced by Shi, Yang Xiong lures Pan Qiaoyun to Mount Cuiping (翠屏山; in present-day Jizhou, Hebei) under the pretext of visiting his ancestors' graves. On the hill, he and Shi Xiu confront her and demand she tells the truth. Scared, Pan admits her wrongdoings. Instigated by Shi, Yang kills her as well as her maid, who has acted as a lookout in the adultery.

Becoming an outlaw[edit] 
Yang Xiong and Shi Xiu decide to seek refuge at the outlaw stronghold of Liangshan Marsh. They are joined by Shi Qian, who has chanced upon the killings while stealing from graves at Mount Cuiping. Along the way, they rest in an inn owned by the Zhu Family Manor. Shi Qian steals the inn's only rooster to cook for meal as the place has nothing nice to offer, sparking off a fight between the three and the innkeeper. Shi Xiu burns down the inn as the innkeeper fetches men to seize them. Shi Qian is caught in a trap as they flee. Yang Xiong and Shi Xiu stumble into the neighbouring Li Family Manor, where they run into Du Xing, who has once received help from Yang in Jizhou. Du takes them to his master Li Ying, who agrees to help them get Shi Qian freed. Li submits the request in two consecutive letters to the Zhu Family Manor, but the Zhus refuse both times. When Li Ying goes to confront them, he is injured by an arrow. Yang Xiong and Shi Xiu then proceed to Liangshan, their only hope to save Shi Qian. After three offensives, Liangshan overruns the Zhu Family Manor and releases Shi Qian.

Death
Yang Xiong is appointed as one of the leaders of the Liangshan infantry after the 108 Stars of Destiny came together in what is called the Grand Assembly. He participates in the campaigns against the Liao invaders and rebel forces on Song territory following amnesty from Emperor Huizong for Liangshan. 

He survives the run of campaigns but dies from a tumour on his back when returning to the imperial capital Dongjing.

See also
 List of Water Margin minor characters#Yang Xiong's story for a list of supporting minor characters from Yang Xiong's story.

References
 
 
 
 
 
 
 

36 Heavenly Spirits
Fictional prison officers and governors
Fictional characters from Henan